The Q58 and Q58 Limited are bus routes that constitute a public transit line operating primarily in Queens, New York City, with its southern terminal on the border with Brooklyn. The Q58 is operated by the MTA New York City Transit Authority. Its precursor was a streetcar line that began operation in November 1899. and was known variously as the Flushing–Ridgewood Line, the Corona Avenue Line, and the Fresh Pond Road Line. The route became a bus line in 1949.

The Q58 operates between two major bus/subway hubs: the Ridgewood Terminal on the border of Ridgewood, Queens and Bushwick, Brooklyn; and the Flushing – Main Street terminal in Downtown Flushing, Queens. It is among the busiest bus lines in the borough of Queens, with 9.79 million people riding the route in 2014.

Route description
The original route of the Flushing–Ridgewood streetcar began at 41st Road and Main Street in Downtown Flushing, just south of the Main Street station of the Long Island Rail Road, and several blocks south of the Main Street subway station on the IRT Flushing Line. It ran south on Lawrence and Rodman Streets, and west on Horace Harding Boulevard to Corona, crossing the Flushing River at Strong's Causeway. It then ran generally west along the winding Corona Avenue to Queens Boulevard in Elmhurst, and on Grand Avenue to Maspeth. Between Junction Boulevard in Corona and the intersection of Grand and Flushing Avenues in Maspeth, the line shared a right-of-way with the Grand Street Line. After a short portion on Flushing Avenue and 61st Street, it ran south down Fresh Pond Road to the Fresh Pond Road station of the BMT Myrtle Avenue Line, where a major trolley barn existed. It then followed the right-of-way of the Myrtle El and former Lutheran Cemetery Surface Line to its own dedicated barn at the Ridgewood Depot, located at Palmetto Street underneath the Myrtle-Wyckoff Avenue subway station.

The current Q58 bus route follows the former trolley route, with some exceptions. The right-of-ways of Lawrence Street and Rodman Street along the route have since been replaced with College Point Boulevard, while the Long Island Expressway was built over the corridor containing Horace Harding Boulevard and Strong's Causeway. The former trolley barn at Fresh Pond Road is now the Fresh Pond Bus Depot in Ridgewood, where the route is now dispatched from (during 2019, the route was dispatched from the Grand Avenue Depot in Maspeth). Due to using several different streets, including winding roads and many tight turns, the Q58 consistently ranks among the slowest bus routes in New York City, and has been cited for pedestrian safety issues. Short strips of the trolley tracks still exist in Ridgewood, at 60th Place and at Woodbine Street underneath the Myrtle El. Tracks on the rest of the route were paved over.

History

Streetcar service

The streetcar line was operated by the Brooklyn and Queens Transit Corporation, a subsidiary of the Brooklyn Rapid Transit Company (BRT) and later Brooklyn–Manhattan Transit Corporation (BMT) which operated many streetcar lines, and several rapid transit lines including some of the city's first subway lines. The line began operation on June 20, 1896 as the Fresh Pond Road Line, running the same route except turning north at Junction Boulevard (then Junction Avenue) and Corona Avenue towards Bowery Bay (the current site of LaGuardia Airport). In November 1899, the Flushing–Ridgewood routing began service. Around this time, the Junction Boulevard portion of the line became a shuttle known as the North Beach Line, while the Grand Street Line was truncated to the Maspeth Trolley Depot at Grand Avenue and 69th Street. On October 19, 1919, the line was extended from the Fresh Pond Depot south to Ridgewood terminal at the Brooklyn-Queens line. Between 1939 and 1940, the line served passengers going to the 1939 New York World's Fair in Flushing Meadows–Corona Park.

Bus service
Beginning in the 1920s, many streetcar lines in Queens, Brooklyn, and the rest of the city began to be replaced by buses, particularly after the unification of city's three primary transit companies (including the BMT) under municipal operations in June 1940. Buses began running on the line as early as 1946. On June 30, 1949, the New York City Board of Estimate approved the full motorization of the line with buses. The Flushing–Ridgewood line was officially replaced by city-owned buses on July 17, 1949, The line was designated B58 ("B" the designation for buses based in Brooklyn), and the line was renamed the Corona Avenue Line. The early fleet consisted of General Motors-built buses.

On July 27, 1960, the B58 was moved to the newly opened Fresh Pond Bus Depot, after operating from bus depots in Brooklyn. During the 1964 New York World's Fair, the B58 was rerouted to stop at the Rodman Street entrance of Flushing Meadows Park. On December 11, 1988, the B58 was renumbered Q58. Due to slow trips and high passenger load, limited-stop service was added to the route on September 12, 2010. Community Boards 5 and 8 had been asking for the introduction of limited-stop service for the Q58 for years, but limited service was only added at this time because the Q58 had reached the headway required for limited-stop service. The Q58 was moved to Grand Avenue Depot in 2019, possibly in preparation for conversion to Select Bus Service (SBS), since the Grand Avenue Depot can hold the articulated buses used on the SBS system. However, the Q58 was moved back to Fresh Pond Depot in January 2020.

Bus redesign
In December 2019, the MTA released a draft redesign of the Queens bus network. As part of the redesign, the Q58 would have become a "intra-borough" route called the QT58, and it would be rerouted east of 108th Street to use Roosevelt Avenue rather than Horace Harding Expressway and College Point Boulevard. A new "high-density" route known as the QT6 would have been created, running parallel to the QT58 from Myrtle–Wyckoff Avenues to Grand Avenue–Newtown before running along Queens Boulevard, Horace Harding Expressway, and College Point Boulevard. The QT6 would have fewer stops than the QT58. The redesign was delayed due to the COVID-19 pandemic in New York City in 2020, and the original draft plan was dropped due to negative feedback.

A revised plan was released in March 2022. Under the new plan, the Q58 would use 111st Street and Roosevelt Avenue to cross Flushing Meadows Park. A new "crosstown" route with limited stops, the Q98, was also proposed; it would duplicate the QT6 proposal and would make many of the same stops as the existing Q58 Limited. West of the intersection of Grand Avenue and Queens Boulevard, the Q98 would follow the Q58. East of that intersection, the Q98 would run along Queens Boulevard, Horace Harding Expressway, and College Point Boulevard.

See also
 Q59 (New York City bus)
 Q72 (New York City bus)

References

External links

 

Q058
Streetcar lines in Brooklyn
Streetcar lines in Queens, New York
058
Grand Street and Grand Avenue